William Carl Whaley (February 10, 1896 – March 3, 1943) was a Major League Baseball player. He played in the outfield and was 5 foot 11 and 178 pounds.

Career 
Whaley's Major League debut was on April 16, 1923. He played just one season in the league, as a member of the St. Louis Browns in 1923. In 23 career games, he had 12 hits with an average of .240. He had no home runs, 1 RBI, and 5 runs scored. His final career game was on October 6, 1923.

Early life 
William "Bill" Carl Whaley was born 10 February 1896 in Indianapolis, Indiana. His mother was Anna Schissel (1874-1936). She married Frank Walter Whaley (1869-1955) 27 October 1900 in Indianapolis, Indiana. The family story was that Elias Whaley, Frank's father, went to Indianapolis from California and broke up the marriage and brought Frank back to California and that  this was not Frank Walter Whaley's son however Bill took the surname of Whaley.

Family
Bill married Miss Jessie Graves 3 November 1925 in Los Angeles, California. He married a second time to Ann Daly (1907 - 1957) 23 June 1935 in Indianapolis, Indiana.

References

External links

 Crown Hill Cemetery 

St. Louis Browns players
1896 births
1943 deaths
Baseball players from Indiana